, (born 22 September 1966 in Akita) is a Japanese former rugby union player and coach. Currently, he works as general manager for Kamaishi Seawaves and as ambassador for the 2019 Rugby World Cup.

Biography
At Akita Industrial High School, he won the first prize at Hanazono. In the third year,
after graduating, Sakuraba joined Nippon Steel Kamaishi, which achieved the seventh consecutive title in the Japanese championship in the previous year.

International career
In 1986, Kazuraba achieved his first cap with the Japan national team against Scotland, at Murrayfield, on 27 September 1986. The following year he was called up by the then coach Katsumi Miyaji to take part to the 1987 Rugby World Cup, where he played only the match against England at Sydney. He also took part in the 1995 Rugby World Cup, where he played all the pool matches and in the 1999 Rugby World Cup, where he played only two matches, against Wales and against Argentina, the former of which was his last cap for Japan.

Coaching career
In 2001, Nippon Steel Kamaishi was renamed Kamaishi Seawaves and Sakuraba retired as a player after the season. In the 2003-04 season, Sakuraba was appointed coach and led Seawaves to the Japanese championship for the first time in 19 years.
In 2005, Sakuraba returned as coach concurrently. The following year, he retired and was appointed as team advisor.

He was the longest active player for the Japan national team since the first World Cup.

Notes

External links

1966 births
Living people
Japanese rugby union players
People from Akita Prefecture
Rugby union locks
Rugby union coaches
Japan international rugby union players
Asian Games medalists in rugby union
Rugby union players at the 1998 Asian Games
Asian Games silver medalists for Japan
Medalists at the 1998 Asian Games
Kamaishi Seawaves players